SP-316  is a state highway in the state of São Paulo in Brazil. It is named after Constante Peruchi, a local farmer. Constante was grandson of Venetian emigrants who lived in Cascalho, a district of Cordeirópolis.

References

Highways in São Paulo (state)